Indústria Aeronáutica Neiva is a subsidiary of Embraer which produces airplanes and aircraft components. Its main product is the Embraer EMB 202 Ipanema, the most employed agricultural aircraft in Brazil and the first alcohol-powered airplane. Neiva delivered more than 3,700 aircraft until early 2006.

It started as a glider manufacturer. It moved to Botucatu in 1956. The company produced many gliders and general aviation aircraft until March 11, 1980, when it was acquired by Embraer. After the acquisition, Neiva also started to produce the Ipanema and various components for Embraer aircraft, including the Embraer ERJ 145 family, the Embraer EMB 314 Super Tucano and the Embraer E-Jets. Neiva also produced the Embraer EMB 120 Brasilia from 1999 to 2002.

Aircraft

External links

 Embraer

Embraer
Companies based in São Paulo (state)
Aircraft manufacturers of Brazil
Defence companies of Brazil
Brazilian brands